Blue Jay Creek is a river on Manitoulin Island in Central Manitoulin and Tehkummah townships, Manitoulin District in northeastern Ontario, Canada and a tributary of Lake Huron.

Course
It flows south under Ontario Highway 542 and then to the east of the community of Tehkummah in Tehkummah township.

Ecology
The Blue Jay Creek and Manitou River Enhancement Strategy was completed in June 2001 and approved in December 2003 by the Manitoulin Streams Improvement Association. The organization has rehabilitated sites on the creek, which has improved water quality and the fisheries in the region.

Parks
Blue Jay Creek Provincial Park incorporates a portion of the creek near its mouth.

Tributaries
Black Creek (right)

See also
List of rivers of Ontario

References

Sources

External links
Manitoulin Streams Improvement Association official website

Rivers of Manitoulin Island
Tributaries of Lake Huron